The Bonded Woman is an extant 1922 American silent drama film produced by Famous Players-Lasky and distributed by Paramount Pictures. It was directed by Phil Rosen and stars Betty Compson, John Bowers, and Richard Dix.

Long thought to be a lost film, a copy was discovered in the Gosfilmofond Russian Archive.

Cast
Betty Compson as Angela Gaskell
John Bowers as John Somers
Richard Dix as Lee Marvin
J. Farrell MacDonald as Captain Gaskell
Ethel Wales as Lucita

References

External links

Poster for the film(Wayback Machine)

1922 films
Films based on short fiction
Films directed by Phil Rosen
American silent feature films
Paramount Pictures films
1922 drama films
Silent American drama films
American black-and-white films
1920s rediscovered films
Rediscovered American films
1920s American films